Technodiktator is the fifth studio album by the Finnish industrial metal band Turmion Kätilöt, released on 27 September 2013.

Track listing

References 

2013 albums
Turmion Kätilöt albums
2011 albums